Fatih Aksoy (born 6 November 1997) is a Turkish professional footballer who plays as a centre-back for Süper Lig club Alanyaspor.

Club career
Fatih made his professional debut for Beşiktaş in a 2–1 Turkish Cup win over Kayserispor on 14 December 2016. He made his Süper Lig debut with Beşiktaş in a 0–0 draw against Yeni Malatyaspor on 25 November 2017.

International career
Fatih is a youth international for Turkey, and represented them at the 2018 Toulon Tournament.

References

External links
 
 
 
 

1997 births
Living people
People from Üsküdar
Turkish footballers
Turkey youth international footballers
Beşiktaş J.K. footballers
Sivasspor footballers
Süper Lig players
Alanyaspor footballers
Association football defenders
21st-century Turkish people
Footballers from Istanbul